Donald Edward Pienkos (born 1944) is a Polish-American historian at the University of Wisconsin-Milwaukee specializing in the history of Polish-American community.

He received the Officer’s Cross of Merit from the President of Poland, November 2010.

His works on Milwaukee's Polonia have been described as "most useful".

Works
For your freedom through ours: Polish American efforts on Poland's behalf, 1863-1991, 1991

References

External links
Homepage at University of Wisconsin-Milwaukee

1944 births
University of Wisconsin–Milwaukee faculty
American people of Polish descent
20th-century American historians
20th-century American male writers
Historians of Poland
Recipients of the Order of Merit of the Republic of Poland
University of Wisconsin–Madison alumni
DePaul University alumni
Historians of the United States
Living people
American male non-fiction writers